The UEFA European Under-18 Championship 1979 Final Tournament was held in Austria.

Qualification

Group 2

Group 12

Other groups

|}

Teams
The following teams qualified for the tournament:

  (host)

Squads

Group stage

Group A

Group B

Group C

Group D

Semifinals

Third place match

Final

External links
Results by RSSSF

UEFA European Under-19 Championship
1979
Under-18
UEFA European Under-18 Championship
1970s in Vienna
Sports competitions in Vienna
UEFA European Under-18 Championship
UEFA European Under-18 Championship
1979 in youth association football